LevelUp is an American mobile ordering and mobile payments platform created by Boston, Massachusetts–based start-up SCVNGR. On July 25, 2018, it was announced that LevelUp would be acquired for US$390 million by Grubhub, an online food delivery platform.

History
LevelUp was initially launched in March 2011, and operated for its first 3 months as a daily deals platform. In July 2011, LevelUp shifted away from  daily deals to focus exclusively on facilitating mobile payments. In July 2013, around 200,000 users and 3,000 companies were using LevelUp. In October 2014, around 14,000 stores were using LevelUp. In May 2017, they announced that they had raised $50 million in funding, with over 50,000 locations and more than 200 brands using Levelup.

Overview
The LevelUp mobile application for iPhone, Android and Windows Phone allowed registered users to securely link their debit or credit card to a unique QR code displayed within the app. To pay with LevelUp, users scanned the QR code on their phone at LevelUp terminals located at local businesses who accept LevelUp as a form of payment.

Some merchants that accepted LevelUp as a form of payment also offered monetary savings to users. Users are given “First-Time Visit Specials” the first time they made a transaction at the merchant's location. Users could also unlock "credit" to a merchant's store after spending a certain amount at the merchant's location.

As of June 2016, LevelUp was available for businesses in the Boston, Chicago, Washington DC, Northern Virginia, Philadelphia, St. Louis, New York City, Atlanta, San Francisco, Dallas, San Diego, Minneapolis, Montgomery, Kansas City, Seattle, and Wilmington (North Carolina) areas.

In early 2018, the company announced the release of Broadcast, enabling restaurant brands to reach new customers by allowing them to browse live menus, order ahead and pay directly from high-traffic apps such as Facebook, Messenger, Yelp, Foursquare, Amazon Alexa and Chase Pay.

As of September 30, 2021, the LevelUp app is no longer available.

References

Further reading

External links
 

Financial services companies established in 2011
Online financial services companies of the United States
Mobile payments
Online food ordering
Financial technology companies
Companies based in Boston
2011 establishments in Massachusetts